"Over You" is the fourth single released by the Belgian dance group Lasgo after the addition of Jelle Van Dael as vocals.

Track listing
CD Maxi-Single (Belgium and United States)
"Over You" (Radio Edit) – 3:23
"Over You" (Extended Mix) – 4:51
"Over You" (Munkie Boi’s Bootie Dub) – 7:40

Chart performance

References

External links 

2009 singles
Lasgo songs
2009 songs
Songs written by Peter Luts
Songs written by Basto (musician)